In the early morning of December 11, 2019, the Taliban attacked Bagram Air Base in Afghanistan, which at the time was controlled by the United States. The attackers used two car bombs which killed two civilians and injured 80 others.

The attack
Taliban insurgents attacked the western part of the base following the explosion. The attack was repelled by a US-led NATO forces. At 5:50 AM a 22,500 lb VBIED (Vehicle Borne IED) was detonated at Bagram Airfield abandoned medical facility that was walled off separate from the rest of the base. Six people were wounded from the blast.

American military response
Just minutes after the attacks, Marine advisors and their Georgian military counterparts responded to the attacks. The Marines and Georgians were in charge of perimeter security for Bagram Airfield Security Forces (BAFSECFOR). At the time of the attack BAFSECFOR was headquartered by the 307th Airborne Engineer Battalion, and organized as Task Force Cobalt.

Task Force Cobalt pushed more combat power to the site of the initial attack, mainly elements of 1st Platoon, 348th Engineer Company (Route Clearance), focusing on containing taliban fighters from entering the main portion of the base.  Heavy small arms fire and rockets could be heard In the area of the initial car bomb but taliban fighters were unsuccessful from entering the main portion of the base.  16 hours after the initial attack US fighter aircraft bombed the area outside of the military base colloquially known as the Korean hospital.

Following the attack HHC, 307th AEB coordinated the closing of the breach in the perimeter created by the initial blast and subsequent bombings by US Forces.

References 

2019 in international relations
2019 murders in Afghanistan
21st century in Parwan Province
Attacks on military installations in the 2010s
Attacks on United States entities
Crime in Parwan Province
Suicide bombings in 2019
Suicide car and truck bombings in Afghanistan
Taliban attacks
Taliban bombings
Terrorist incidents in Afghanistan in 2019
Attacks in Afghanistan in 2019